Cryobacterium arcticum is a Gram-positive, psychrotolerant and aerobic bacterium from the genus Cryobacterium which has been isolated from soil from Store Koldewey in Greenland.

References

Microbacteriaceae
Bacteria described in 2011